Dover is a city in and the county seat of Stewart County, Tennessee,  west-northwest of Nashville on the Cumberland River. Fort Donelson National Cemetery is in Dover. The population was 1,442 at the 2000 census and the 2010 census showed a population of 1,417.

Dover is part of the Clarksville, TN–Kentucky Metropolitan Statistical Area.

Geography 
Dover is located at  (36.482316, -87.844678).

Climate

Demographics

2020 census 

As of the 2020 United States census, there were 1,826 people, 697 households, and 381 families residing in the city.

2000 census 
As of the census of 2000, there were 1,442 people, 608 households, and 373 families residing in the city. The racial makeup of the city was 94.73% White, 3.05% African American, 0.69% Native American, 0.07% Asian, 0.55% from other races, and 0.90% from two or more races. Hispanic or Latino of any race were 0.83% of the population.

There were 608 households, out of which 23.0% had children under the age of 18 living with them, 49.3% were married couples living together, 7.2% had a female householder with no husband present, and 38.5% were non-families. 36.3% of all households were made up of individuals, and 21.7% had someone living alone who was 65 years of age or older. The average household size was 2.21 and the average family size was 2.88.

In the city, the population distribution was: 19.4% under the age of 18, 5.1% from 18 to 24, 24.2% from 25 to 44, 24.1% from 45 to 64, and 27.3% who were 65 years of age or older. The median age was 46 years. For every 100 females, there were 83.7 males. For every 100 females age 18 and over, there were 80.2 males.

The median income for a household in the city was $33,839, and the median income for a family was $42,266. Males had a median income of $27,227 versus $21,563 for females. The per capita income for the city was $18,483. About 8.1% of families and 11.1% of the population were below the poverty line, including 9.5% of those under age 18 and 16.7% of those age 65 or over.

Tourism 
Fort Donelson, the site of a major Union victory in the Civil War, is located west of downtown Dover and located inside Fort Donelson National Battlefield Park.

Cross Creeks National Wildlife Refuge, a  habitat for waterfowl and aquatic plant life, is located on the Cumberland River east of Dover.

Media 
Radio stations:
 WTPR-FM 101.7 - "The Greatest Hits of All Time"
 WTPR-AM 710 - "The Greatest Hits of All Time"
 WRQR-FM 105.5 - "Today's Best Music with Ace & TJ in the Morning"

Notable people 
 Isham N. Haynie, lawyer, politician, soldier and officer in the Union Army.
 William B. Ross, 12th Governor of Wyoming.
 Bernie Walter, professional baseball player.

References

External links 

 Dover, Tennessee official website
 Dover, Tennessee official school website
 

 
Cities in Tennessee
Cities in Stewart County, Tennessee
County seats in Tennessee
Clarksville metropolitan area